is a single by Not Yet. It reached number-one in the Oricon Weekly Chart.

References

2012 singles
Oricon Weekly number-one singles
Japanese-language songs
Not Yet (band) songs
Nippon Columbia singles
Songs with lyrics by Yasushi Akimoto
2012 songs